Wiang Chiang Rung is a district (amphoe) of Chiang Rai province, northern Thailand.

Geography
Neighboring districts are (from the west clockwise) Mueang Chiang Rai, Doi Luang, Chiang Khong, Phaya Mengrai and Wiang Chai of Chiang Rai Province.

History
The minor district (king amphoe) was established on 1 April 1995, when it was split off from Wiang Chai district
. At first named Chiang Rung, it was renamed Wiang Chiang Rung on 1 March 1996.

On 15 May 2007, all 81 minor districts were upgraded to full districts. With publication in the Royal Gazette on 24 August the upgrade became official.

Administration
The district is divided into three sub-districts (tambons), which are further subdivided into 43 villages (mubans). Ban Lao is a township (thesaban tambon) which covers parts of tambons Thung Ko and Dong Maha Wan. There are a further three tambon administrative organizations (TAO).

References

External links

amphoe.com

Wiang Chiang Rung